Microneura caligata is a species of damselfly in the family Protoneuridae. It is endemic to Cuba.  Its natural habitats are subtropical or tropical moist lowland forests and rivers. It is threatened by habitat loss.

Sources

Fauna of Cuba
Protoneuridae
Endemic fauna of Cuba
Insects described in 1886
Taxonomy articles created by Polbot
Taxobox binomials not recognized by IUCN